Alexander Sachs (August 1, 1893 – June 23, 1973) was an American economist and banker. In October 1939 he delivered the Einstein–Szilárd letter to President Franklin D. Roosevelt, suggesting that nuclear-fission research ought to be pursued with a view to possibly constructing nuclear weapons, should they prove feasible, in view of the likelihood that Nazi Germany would do so. This led to the initiation of the United States' Manhattan Project.

Life and career

Born in Rossien (now Raseiniai), Lithuania to Samuel and Sarah Sachs, Alexander moved to the U.S. in 1904 to join his brother, Joseph A. Sachs. He was educated at Townsend Harris High School, City College of New York, and Columbia College, all in New York City. 

In 1913, he joined the municipal bond department at Boston-based investment bank Lee, Higginson & Co. but in 1915 returned to education as a graduate student in social sciences, philosophy, and jurisprudence at Harvard College. In later life, he was on the faculty at Princeton University.

Between 1918 and 1921 he was an aide to Justice Louis Brandeis and the Zionist Organization of America on international problems of the Middle East and the World War I peace conference.

From 1922 to 1929 he was economist and investment analyst for Walter Eugene Meyer in equity investment acquisitions. He then organized and became director of Economics Investment Research at the Lehman Corporation, a newly established investment company of Lehman Brothers. In 1931 he joined the board at Lehman. He was vice president from 1936 to 1943, remaining on the board until his death at the age of 79.

In 1933, Sachs served as organizer and chief of the economic research division of the National Recovery Administration. In 1936 he served on the National Policy Committee. During the war, he was economic adviser to the Petroleum Industry War Council and special counsel to the director of the Office of Strategic Services.

Family
He was married to German-born artist, inventor, and entrepreneur, Charlotte Cramer Sachs (1907–2004).

Atomic bomb
Richard G. Hewlett and Oscar E. Anderson describe Sachs's role in bringing to President Roosevelt's attention the possibility of an atomic bomb:

Notes

References

 Robert Jungk, Brighter than a Thousand Suns:  The Story of the Men Who Made The Bomb, translated [from the German] by James Cleugh, New York, Grove Press, 1958.

1893 births
1973 deaths
Lithuanian Jews
American people of Lithuanian-Jewish descent
American Zionists
Emigrants from the Russian Empire to the United States
Columbia College (New York) alumni
Harvard College alumni
American bankers
National Recovery Administration
People of the Office of Strategic Services
People from Raseiniai
Townsend Harris High School alumni
Economists from New York (state)
20th-century American economists